The following are the national records in track cycling in Italy maintained by the Federazione Ciclistica Italiana (FCI).

Men

Women

References

External links
 FCI web site

Italy
Records
Track cycling
track cycling